Club Balonmano Cantabria was a team of handball based in Santander, Cantabria. CB Cantabria was not registered in any handball league after 2008.

History
Balonmano Cantabria was founded in 1975 when bought the seat of CB La Salle Authi from Los Corrales de Buelna. La Salle Authi was for a long time sponsored by Authi. From 1972–73 season to 1974–75 season, La Salle Authi played in Primera División (2nd tier). In 1975, the industrial company based in Santander, Teka, bought the team's seat and relocated it to Santander from Los Corrales de Buelna. The team was renamed more later as G.D. Teka.

Club names
Teka - (1990–1995)
Cantabria - (1995–1996)
Caja Cantabria - (1996–2000)
Cantabria - (2000–2004)
Teka Cantabria - (2004–2008)

Season by season

18 seasons in Liga ASOBAL

Trophies
Liga ASOBAL: 2
1992–93, 1993–94
King's Cup: 2
1988–89, 1994–95
ASOBAL Cup: 4
1990–91, 1991–92, 1996–97, 1997–98
Supercopa ASOBAL: 2
1992–93, 1994–95
EHF Champions League: 1
1993–94
EHF Cup: 1
1992–93
EHF Cup Winner's Cup: 2
1989–90, 1997–98
IHF Super Globe: 1
1996–97

Last Squad (2007-08 season)

Statistics 2007/08

Goals:
Rodrigo Reñones - 103 goals
Tim Bauer - 94 goals
Ouallid Ben Amor - 83 goals
Catches:
Jorge Oliva - 171 catches 27%
Dimitros Kaffatos - 124 catches 27%

Stadium information
Name: - Palacio de los Deportes
City: - Santander
Capacity: - 6,200 people
Address: - C/ Alta Nº133, s/n (very near to Estadio El Sardinero).

Notable players

Notable coaches
Rafael Pastor
Luis Morante
Javier García Cuesta
Manolo Cadenas
Emilio Alonso
Julián Ruiz
Valentín Pastor
Agustín Medina (caretaker)
Jaume Puig
 Jovica Elezović
Juan José Campos
Alberto Urdiales
Fran Ávila
Juan Domínguez Munaiz

References

External links
CB Cantabria Official Website
 Documentacion para entrenadores de Balonmano
 Revista digital de la Liga Asobal

Handball in Cantabria
Spanish handball clubs
Sport in Santander, Spain
Handball clubs established in 1975
Sports clubs disestablished in 2008
Defunct handball clubs
1975 establishments in Spain
2008 disestablishments in Spain
Sports teams in Cantabria